Lockwood House may refer to:

Allen-Lockwood House, Bluffton, South Carolina
Henry Lockwood House, Harpers Ferry, West Virginia
Hoffecker-Lockwood House, Kenton, Delaware
Isaac Lockwood House, Marshall, Michigan, listed on the National Register of Historic Places (NRHP)
J.C. Lockwood House, Milan, Ohio, listed on the NRHP
Lockwood-Boynton House, North Springfield, Vermont
Lockwood–Mathews Mansion, Norwalk, Connecticut